The St. Petersburg Times may refer to the following:

The St. Petersburg Times (Russia), a former Russian newspaper
 The St. Petersburg Times, former name of the Tampa Bay Times, an American newspaper